Brett St. Martin (born October 23, 1999) is an American soccer player.

Playing career

Youth, college and amateur
St. Martin played high school soccer at Mount Saint Joseph High School, where he was a two-time all-state and All-MIAA selection, been named to the Adidas All-American game in 2017. He also played club soccer for Baltimore Celtics, helping the team to become 2016 and 2018 State Cup Champions and 2017 Regional Champions.

In 2018, St. Martin attended the University of Maryland to play college soccer, where he went on to make 61 appearances for the Terrapins over four years, scoring two goals and tallying two assists. St. Martin captained the team in 2020 and 2021 and earned accolades such as 2021 First Team All-Big Ten, 2020-21 Second Team All-Big Ten, 2021 United Soccer Coaches All-North Region, a three-time Academic All-Big Ten and helped the team to become 2018 National Champions.

Professional
On January 11, 2022, St. Martin was selected 50th overall in the 2022 MLS SuperDraft by Sporting Kansas City. However, he did not sign with the club. 

On March 7, 2022, St. Martin was announced as having signed with USL Championship side Charleston Battery. He made his professional debut on March 12, 2022, starting against FC Tulsa. Following the 2022 season, St. Martin was released by Charleston.

References 

Living people
1999 births
American soccer players
Association football defenders
Charleston Battery players
Maryland Terrapins men's soccer players
People from Mount Airy, Maryland
Soccer players from Maryland
Sporting Kansas City draft picks
USL Championship players